Henry Scott Holland (27 January 1847–17 March 1918) was Regius Professor of Divinity at the University of Oxford.  He was also a canon of Christ Church, Oxford. The Scott Holland Memorial Lectures are held in his memory.

Family and education
Holland was born on 27 January 1847 at Ledbury, Herefordshire, the son of George Henry Holland (1818–1891) of Dumbleton Hall, Evesham, and Charlotte Dorothy Gifford, the daughter of Lord Gifford. He was educated at Eton where he was a pupil of the influential Master William Johnson Cory, and at Balliol College, Oxford, where he took a first-class degree in greats. During his Oxford time he was greatly influenced by T. H. Green. He had the Oxford degrees of DD, MA, and honorary DLitt. He was ordained as a deacon in 1872 and as a priest in 1874.

Religious and political activity

After graduation, he was elected as a Student (fellow) of Christ Church, Oxford.  In 1884, he left Oxford for St Paul's Cathedral where he was appointed canon.

He was keenly interested in social justice and formed PESEK (Politics, Economics, Socialism, Ethics and Christianity) which blamed capitalist exploitation for contemporary urban poverty. In 1889, he formed the Christian Social Union.

In 1910, he was appointed Regius Professor of Divinity at Oxford University, a post he held until his death on 17 March 1918. He is buried in the churchyard of All Saints Church, Cuddesdon, near Oxford. Because of his surname, Mary Gladstone referred to him affectionately as "Flying Dutchman" and "Fliegende Holländer".

While at St Paul's Cathedral Holland delivered a sermon in May 1910 following the death of King Edward VII, titled Death the King of Terrors, in which he explores the natural but seemingly contradictory responses to death: the fear of the unexplained and the belief in continuity. It is from his discussion of the latter that perhaps his best-known writing, Death is nothing at all, is drawn:

The frequent use of this passage has provoked some criticism that it fails to accurately reflect either Holland's theology as a whole, or the focus of the sermon in particular. What has not provoked as much criticism is the affinity of Holland's passage to Augustine of Hippo's thoughts in his fourth-century letter 263 to Sapida, in which he writes that Sapida's brother and their love, although he has died, still are there, like gold that still is yours even if you save it in some locker.

References

Footnotes

Bibliography

Further reading

External links

 
 Henry S. Holland (at Spartacus Educational)
 
 

1847 births
1918 deaths
19th-century English Anglican priests
19th-century English theologians
20th-century English Anglican priests
20th-century English theologians
Alumni of Balliol College, Oxford
Anglo-Catholic clergy
Anglo-Catholic socialists
Anglo-Catholic theologians
Christian hymnwriters
Christian socialist theologians
English Anglo-Catholics
English Christian socialists
Fellows of Christ Church, Oxford
People educated at Eton College
People from Ledbury
Regius Professors of Divinity (University of Oxford)